Events from the year 1980 in Iran.

Incumbents
 Supreme Leader: Ruhollah Khomeini 
 President: Abolhassan Banisadr (starting February 4)
 Prime Minister: Council of Islamic Revolution (until August 12), Mohammad-Ali Rajai (starting August 12)
 Chief Justice: Mohammad Beheshti

Events

 Beginning of Iran–Iraq War by Iraq.
 September 23 – Iran Air Force launched Operation Kaman 99 against Iraqi offensive.
 September 30 – Iranian Air Force launched Operation Scorch Sword against Iraqi nuclear developments in Osirak.
 October 9 – Iran Air force launched Operation Sultan 10 against Iraqi offensive.
 November 6 – Iraqi army started Siege of Abadan.
 November 10 – Iraqi army recaptured Iranian town of Khorramshahr
 November 28–29 – Iranian Navy and Air Force dismantled most of Iraqi navy in Operation Morvarid.

See also
 Years in Iraq
 Years in Afghanistan

References

 
Iran
Years of the 20th century in Iran
Iran
1980s in Iran